Princess Elisabeth of Luxembourg (Elisabeth Marie Wilhelmine; 7 March 1901 – 2 August 1950) was the daughter of William IV, Grand Duke of Luxembourg, and his wife, Infanta Marie Anne of Portugal.

In 1922, she married Prince Ludwig Philipp of Thurn and Taxis.

Family
Elisabeth was the fifth-eldest daughter and child of William IV, Grand Duke of Luxembourg, and his wife, Infanta Marie Anne of Portugal. Two of Elisabeth's elder sisters reigned as sovereign Grand Duchess of Luxembourg and titular Duchess of Nassau: Marie-Adélaïde and Charlotte.

Marriage and issue
Elisabeth married Prince Ludwig Philipp of Thurn and Taxis, fourth child and son of Albert, 8th Prince of Thurn and Taxis, and his wife, Archduchess Margarethe Klementine of Austria, on 14 November 1922 in Hohenburg, Bavaria. Elisabeth and Ludwig had two children, five grandchildren, sixteen great-grandchildren, and three great-great-grandchildren:

 Prince Anselm Albert Ludwig Maria Lamoral of Thurn and Taxis (14 April 1924 – 25 February 1944), killed in World War II
 Princess Iniga of Thurn and Taxis (25 August 1925 – 17 September 2008) married Prince Eberhard of Urach on 18 May 1948. They have five children, sixteen grandchildren and three great-grandchildren

Prince Ludwig was killed in 1933 in a car accident. Elisabeth died in 1950 at age 49, at their home, Schloss Niederaichbach and was buried next to her husband at St. Emmeram's Abbey, Regensburg.

Ancestry

References

1901 births
1950 deaths
Luxembourgian princesses
People from Luxembourg City
Burials at the Gruftkapelle, St. Emmeram's Abbey
House of Nassau-Weilburg
Road incident deaths in Germany
Princesses of Thurn und Taxis
Daughters of monarchs